("maple") may refer to:

Kaede (protein), a photosynthetic activated fluorescent protein
, several torn down ships

People
, Japanese dancer, fashion model and actress
, murder victim of Kaoru Kobayashi
, Japanese voice actress
, Japanese musician, ex-member of Morning Musume
, Japanese basketball player
, Japanese women's footballer
, Japanese professional footballer
, Japanese athlete

Fictional characters
Kaede, a Patriot from Marie Lu's Legend Trilogy
Lady Kaede, the villain from Akira Kurosawa's Ran
Kaede, a Blade Brandier from the .hack//G.U. series
Kaede (InuYasha), supporting character of InuYasha and InuYasha: The Final Act
Kaede (Last Blade), the main character in The Last Blade series of games
Kaede Sakura, a character from the Japanese novel series Kämpfer
Kaede, the female protagonist of Elfen Lied, more commonly known as  Lucy
Kaede, a kunoichi (female ninja) from the video game Onimusha
Kaede, a female "shadow" or ninja in the video game Shadow of the Ninja
Kaede Shiranui from Ninin Ga Shinobuden
Kaede Agano, a Neon Genesis Evangelion character
Kaede Akamatsu, a Danganronpa V3: Killing Harmony character
Kaede Fuyou, a character in the H game and anime Shuffle!
Kaede Minami, the Japanese name of Katie, a character from Mirmo! (Selfish Fairy Mirumo de Pon in Japanese)
Kaede Misumi, of the Onegai series
Kaede Murenai, a character in the anime Betterman
Kaede Mizuno, a character from the manga/anime Nyan Koi!
Kaede Nagase, a Negima!: Magister Negi Magi character
Kaede Rukawa, a Slam Dunk character
Kaede Saitou, an Angelic Layer character
Kaede Shirakawa, the female protagonist of Lian Hearn's popular Tales of the Otori trilogy
Kaede Smith, a playable character in the video game, Killer7
Kaede Kaburagi, the daughter of Kotetsu T. Kaburagi in Tiger and Bunny.
Kaede, the Huntress and protagonist of Malinda Lo's Huntress
Kaede Higa, the Red Rose-Rhode Knight from the manga Barajou no Kiss
Kaede Ichinose, the last appeared Idol in anime Aikatsu!
Kaede, the female companion of Chifusa Manyuu from the Seinen anime Manyuu Hikencho
Kaede, a character from the anime Honoo no Haramase Tenkousei
Kaede Ikeno, the tomboyish prankster secondary main character from the manga/anime Sakura Trick
Kaede Saitou, the mountain climber girl from the manga/anime Yama no Susume
Kaede Kagayama, the candy store owner from the manga/anime Non Non Biyori, more commonly called "Candy Lady" or "Candy Store"
Kaede Furutani, a YuruYuri character
Kaede Kayano, a character from Assassination Classroom
Kaede Takagaki, a character in the game The Idolmaster Cinderella Girls
Kaede Manyuda, a side character in the manga/anime Kakegurui

See also
Kaede ~If Trans...~, a VHS released by Japanese rock band Dir En Grey

Japanese feminine given names